Club Deportivo Fortuna are a Spanish football team from Leganés, in the Madrid outskirts. Founded on 1968, they currently play in Preferente. They play shirts with green stripes, and red. Their home stadium is the Estadio de La Fortuna, which seats 3,000 spectators.

Season to season

3 seasons in Tercera División

External links
Official website 
Futbolme team profile 
www.futmadrid.com 

Football clubs in the Community of Madrid
Association football clubs established in 1968
Divisiones Regionales de Fútbol clubs
1968 establishments in Spain
Sport in Leganés